Events from the year 1696 in France

Incumbents
 Monarch – Louis XIV

Events

 The Edict of 1696 

This Edict stated that for a coat of arms to be valid, it had to be registered with the King of Arms for a fee. Due to this, 110 000 coats of arms were registered by d'Hozier, the King of Arms. 

 Treaty of Turin

Signed on 29 August 1696 by the French King and the Duchy of Savoy, ended the latter's involvement in the Nine Years' War.

Births

31 July – Dumont de Montigny, colonial officer (died 1760)

Full date missing
Esprit Antoine Blanchard, musician (died 1770)

Deaths
14 March – Jean Domat, jurisconsult (born 1625)
14 April – Isaac de l'Ostal de Saint-Martin, chevalier (born c.1629)
17 April – Marie de Rabutin-Chantal, marquise de Sévigné, aristocrat (born 1626)
27 April – Simon Foucher, polemic philosopher (born 1644)
11 May – Jean de La Bruyère, philosopher and moralist (born 1645)
29 June – Michel Lambert, composer (born 1610)
28 July – Charles Colbert, marquis de Croissy, statesman and diplomat (born 1625)
21 December – Louise Moillon, painter (born 1610)

Full date missing
Antoine Varillas, historian (born 1624)
Jean Richer, astronomer (born 1630)
Jean Baptiste Mathey, architect and painter (born 1630)
Médard des Groseilliers, explorer (born 1618)

See also

References

1690s in France